A political party is a political organization subscribing to a certain ideology or formed around very special issue's and with the aim to participate in power, usually by participating in elections.

Comoros does not have a strong party system. Political groups are formed mainly in support of certain leaders. The only major ideological point of contention is the debate between supporters of a strong federal government and supporters of the autonomous island governments.

Parties

Parliamentary parties

Other parties

Former parties

See also

 Lists of political parties

Comoros
 
Parties
Comoros
Political parties